The 2019 Copa CONMEBOL Libertadores de Futsal was the 19th edition of the Copa Libertadores de Futsal, South America's premier club futsal tournament organized by CONMEBOL. The tournament was held at Buenos Aires, Argentina between 14–21 July 2019.

Carlos Barbosa were the defending champions.

Teams
The competition was contested by 12 teams: the title holders, one entry from each of the ten CONMEBOL associations, plus an additional entry from the host association.

Venues
The tournament was played at the Polideportivo del Club San Lorenzo de Almagro in Buenos Aires.

Draw
The draw of the tournament was held on 4 July 2019, 13:00 ART (UTC−3), at the Predio de Ezeiza of the Argentine Football Association in Buenos Aires. The twelve teams were drawn into three groups of four. The following three teams were seeded:
Group A: the title holders
Group B: the representative (champions) from the host association (Argentina)
Group C: the representative from the association which were the runners-up from the previous edition (Brazil)

The other teams were seeded based on the results of their association in the 2018 Copa Libertadores de Futsal, with the additional entry from the host association seeded last. Each group, apart from the seeded team, contained one team from each of Pot 1, Pot 2, and Pot 3. Teams from the same association could not be drawn into the same group.

Squads

Each team has to submit a squad of 14 players, including a minimum of two goalkeepers.

Group stage
The top two teams of each group and the two best third-placed teams advance to the quarter-finals.

Tiebreakers
The teams are ranked according to points (3 points for a win, 1 point for a draw, 0 points for a loss). If tied on points, tiebreakers are applied in the following order (Regulations Article 21):
Results in head-to-head matches between tied teams (points, goal difference, goals scored);
Goal difference in all matches;
Goals scored in all matches;
Drawing of lots.

All times are local, ART (UTC−3).

Group A

Group B

Group C

Ranking of third-placed teams

Ranking of fourth-placed teams

Knockout stage
In the quarter-finals, semi-finals and final, extra time and penalty shoot-out would be used to decide the winner if necessary (no extra time would be used in the play-offs for third to twelfth place).

Bracket
The quarter-final matchups are:
QF1: Winner Group A vs. 2nd Best Third Place
QF2: Winner Group B vs. 1st Best Third Place
QF3: Winner Group C vs. Runner-up Group A
QF4: Runner-up Group B vs. Runner-up Group C

The semi-final matchups are:
SF1: Winner QF1 vs. Winner QF4
SF2: Winner QF2 vs. Winner QF3

Quarter-finals

Eleventh place play-off

Ninth place play-off

Fifth to eighth place semi-finals

Semi-finals

Seventh place play-off

Fifth place play-off

Third place play-off

Final

Final ranking

References

External links
CONMEBOL Libertadores Futsal Argentina 2019, CONMEBOL.com

2019
2019 in South American futsal
2019 in Argentine football
July 2019 sports events in South America
International futsal competitions hosted by Argentina